Alter Bridge: Live at Wembley – European Tour 2011 is the second concert film and live album by the rock band Alter Bridge. The DVD was filmed at the band's largest headline show at Wembley Arena on November 29, 2011, and was released worldwide on March 26, 2012. The official trailer for Live at Wembley was released on January 5, 2012. Singer Myles Kennedy dedicated the band's performance to the late Freddie Mercury.

Track listing

CD

DVD

Personnel

Band members
 Myles Kennedy — lead vocals, rhythm and lead guitar
 Mark Tremonti — lead and rhythm guitar, backing vocals
 Brian Marshall — bass
 Scott Phillips — drums

Production
 Daniel Catullo — director
 Lionel Pasamonte, Daniel Catullo — production
 Chris Labarbara, Stuart Margolis, Paul Geary, Steve Wood — executive producers
 Brian Sperber — mixing
 Chris Gendrin, Noah Berlow, Brian Katowski — editor
 Ted Kenney — 3D direction
 Rudy Schlacher, Marianna Schlacher, David Chiesa, Carl Schlacher — 3D executive production

References

External links 

 Official Alter Bridge website

Alter Bridge video albums
2012 video albums